Cornelius "Con" McCarthy (14 January 1894 – 5 November 1968) was a New Zealand professional rugby league footballer who played in the 1910s.

International and representative honours
McCarthy who was a butcher by trade, represented Hawkes Bay in 1919, playing for them against Auckland at Carlaw Park. He made his debut for New Zealand in the same season on their tour of Australia where no test matches were played. He made 9 appearances on the tour. He then played for New Zealand against an Auckland XIII after their return. He also played in 2 matches for Hawke's Bay against the touring Australian side. Hawke's Bay were soundly beaten on both matches by 67 to 4 (with McCarthy kicking 2 penalties) and 73-7. In 1920 he played for a Rest of New Zealand team against Auckland and his side were hammered 54-0. On August 5, 1920 McCarthy played in the centres for the North Island against the touring England at Napier. He captained the side who went down 46-5.

Military service
McCarthy briefly served as a lance corporal in F Company, New Zealand Expeditionary Force in 1916, but was discharged after three months as being medically unfit for service. He did not travel overseas or see active service.

References

External links

Search for "McCarthy" at rugbyleagueproject.org

1894 births
1968 deaths
Rugby league players from Napier, New Zealand
New Zealand national rugby league team players
New Zealand rugby league players
Rugby league five-eighths
Hawke's Bay rugby league team players
New Zealand military personnel of World War I